John Edmund Valentine Isaac (14 February 1880 – 9 May 1915), DSO, was an English first-class cricketer: a right-handed batsmen who played ten matches in South Africa and England between 1906 and 1908. He was born at Powick Court, Worcestershire.

Educated at Harrow School, Isaac's first-class debut came for the South Africa Army cricket team in the only match of that standard they ever played, when they met Marylebone Cricket Club (MCC) at Thara Tswane, Pretoria in January 1906. The MCC side were far too strong for their opponents and won by an innings, Isaac making 0 and 8. This match was chiefly notable for Schofield Haigh's feat of taking four wickets in as many balls in the Army's second innings.

In 1906–07 he played four times for Orange Free State in the Currie Cup, though his highest score was only 34 not out. Curiously, in Isaac's eight visits to the crease he was four times out bowled to a man who would take six or more wickets in that innings (JJ Kotze 8-57, RO Schwarz 7-25, AEE Vogler 6-34 & 8-24).

In 1907 and 1908, Isaac made five appearances for Worcestershire County Cricket Club, but never made more than 13 and never played first-class cricket again.

Death and aftermath
Attached to the 2nd battalion, Rifle Brigade, Captain Isaac was killed in action in World War I, at Fromelles, France at the age of 35 during the northern attack of the Battle of Aubers Ridge on 9 May 1915. Initially posted as missing, his body was recovered in April 1921 and identified by the medal ribbons. He was subsequently reburied at New Irish Farm Cemetery, Ypres, West, Belgium.

Isaac's brother Arthur and nephew Herbert also played first-class cricket.

See also
List of solved missing person cases

References

External links
 
 Statistical summary from CricketArchive

1880 births
1910s missing person cases
1915 deaths
British Army personnel of World War I
Burials at New Irish Farm Commonwealth War Graves Commission Cemetery
British military personnel killed in World War I
English cricketers
Formerly missing people
Free State cricketers
Military personnel from Worcestershire
Missing in action of World War I
Missing person cases in France
People educated at Harrow School
Rifle Brigade officers
Worcestershire cricketers